The interstitium is a contiguous fluid-filled space existing between a structural barrier, such as a cell membrane or the skin, and internal structures, such as organs, including muscles and the circulatory system. The fluid in this space is called interstitial fluid, comprises water and solutes, and drains into the lymph system. The interstitial compartment is composed of connective and supporting tissues within the body – called the extracellular matrix – that are situated outside the blood and lymphatic vessels and the parenchyma of organs.

Structure
The non-fluid parts of the interstitium are predominantly collagen types I, III, and V, elastin, and glycosaminoglycans, such as hyaluronan and proteoglycans that are cross-linked to form a honeycomb-like reticulum. Such structural components exist both for the general interstitium of the body, and within individual organs, such as the myocardial interstitium of the heart, the renal interstitium of the kidney, and the pulmonary interstitium of the lung.

The interstitium in the submucosae of visceral organs, the dermis, superficial fascia, and perivascular adventitia are fluid-filled spaces supported by a collagen bundle lattice. The fluid spaces communicate with draining lymph nodes though they do not have lining cells or structures of lymphatic channels.

Functions
The interstitial fluid is a reservoir and transportation system for nutrients and solutes distributing among organs, cells, and capillaries, for signaling molecules communicating between cells, and for antigens and cytokines participating in immune regulation. The composition and chemical properties of the interstitial fluid vary among organs and undergo changes in chemical composition during normal function, as well as during body growth, conditions of inflammation, and development of diseases, as in heart failure and chronic kidney disease.

The total fluid volume of the interstitium during health is about 20% of body weight, but this space is dynamic and may change in volume and composition during immune responses and in conditions such as cancer, and specifically within the interstitium of tumors. The amount of interstitial fluid varies from about 50% of the tissue weight in skin to about 10% in skeletal muscle.

Disease 
In people with lung diseases, heart disease, cancer, kidney disease, immune disorders, and periodontal disease, the interstitial fluid and lymph system are sites where disease mechanisms may arise or develop.

See also
 Extracellular matrix

References 

Anatomy
Extracellular matrix
Matrices (biology)
Tissues (biology)